Lloyd McAteer Battista (born May 14, 1937, in Cleveland, Ohio) is a retired American actor and screenwriter.

Biography
Battista studied acting at the Carnegie Institute of Technology. He was active on Broadway and off-Broadway stages, appearing in productions of plays such as Sexual Perversity in Chicago and The Homecoming. His television roles ranged from the CBS soap opera Love of Life in the 1950s and the mini-series James A. Michener's Texas in 1994. He appeared in movies such as Chisum (1970), Love and Death (1975), and In Hell (2003).

He appeared in several Spaghetti Westerns including some with Tony Anthony that he wrote the screenplays for. Battista wrote the screenplay for Anthony's Treasure of the Four Crowns but did not appear in the film.

On the radio, Battista was heard between 1974 and 1982 on the CBS Radio Mystery Theater. He also wrote The Nose Knows, a guide to Los Angeles area restaurants.

Filmography

External links
 

1937 births
20th-century American male actors
21st-century American male actors
Living people
Male actors from Cleveland